Dolichospermum is a genus of cyanobacteria belonging to the family Nostocaceae.

The genus has cosmopolitan distribution.

Species
As accepted by the GIF:
Dolichospermum affine 
Dolichospermum berezowskii 
Dolichospermum circinale 
Dolichospermum compactum 
Dolichospermum crassum 
Dolichospermum curvum 
Dolichospermum danicum 
Dolichospermum delicatulum 
Dolichospermum ellipsoides 
Dolichospermum farciminiforme 
Dolichospermum flosaquae 
Dolichospermum fuscum 
Dolichospermum halbfassii 
Dolichospermum heterosporum 
Dolichospermum lemmermannii 
Dolichospermum longicellulare 
Dolichospermum macrosporum 
Dolichospermum mendotae 
Dolichospermum mucosum 
Dolichospermum nygaardii 
Dolichospermum perturbatum 
Dolichospermum planctonicum 
Dolichospermum sigmoideum 
Dolichospermum skujaelaxum 
Dolichospermum smithii 
Dolichospermum smithii 
Dolichospermum solitarium 
Dolichospermum spiroides 
Dolichospermum tenericaule 
Dolichospermum viguieri 
Dolichospermum zinserlingii

References

Nostocaceae
Cyanobacteria genera